Peter Higham (born 8 November 1930) was a footballer who played as a forward.

Higham was part of the Nottingham Forest side that won promotion to the First Division during the 1956–57 season. He is currently the last surviving member of that team.

References

External links
 Career statistics

1930 births
Living people
Footballers from Wigan
English footballers
Association football forwards
Wigan Athletic F.C. players
Portsmouth F.C. players
English Football League players
Preston North End F.C. players
Nottingham Forest F.C. players
Doncaster Rovers F.C. players
Rhyl F.C. players
Morecambe F.C. players
Stalybridge Celtic F.C. players
Buxton F.C. players
Mossley A.F.C. players
Bolton Wanderers F.C. players